Andrew Bostock (born 25 February 1985) is a professional rugby league footballer who has played in the 2000s and 2010s.

References

External links
Profile at featherstonerovers.net

1985 births
Dewsbury Rams players
English rugby league players
Featherstone Rovers players
Living people
Place of birth missing (living people)
Rugby league centres
Rugby league players from Yorkshire
Rugby league props
Rugby league second-rows